Tahoua is one of eight Regions of Niger. The capital of the region is the commune of Tahoua. The region covers 106,677 km².

Geography
Tahoua borders Agadez Region to the northeast, Maradi Region to the southeast, Nigeria's Sokoto State to the south, and Mali (Gao and Kidal regions), Dosso Region and Tillabéri Region to the west. Much of the region lies with the Sahel, merging into the Sahara desert in the north.

Settlements
Tahoua is the regional capital; other major settlements include Abalak, Bagaroua, Birni-N'Konni, Bouza, Illela, Keita, Madaoua and Tchintabaraden.

Administrative subdivisions

Tahoua is divided into 12 Departments:

 Abalak Department
 Bagaroua Department
 Bkonni Department
 Bouza Department
 Illela Department
 Keita Department
 Madaoua Department
 Malbaza Department
 Tahoua Department
 Tchintabaraden Department
 Tellia Department
 Tesarawa Department

Demographics
As of 2011 the population of Tahoua Region was 2,741,922. The main ethnolinguistic groups are the Fulani, Hausa and Tuareg.

See also 

Regions of Niger
Departments of Niger
Communes of Niger

References
http://www.stat-niger.org/statistique/file/Affiches_Depliants/Nigerenchiffres2014def.pdf

Portions of this article were translated from the French language Wikipedia article :fr:Tahoua (région).

 
Regions of Niger
Tuareg